The Italian general election of 2013 took place on 24–25 February 2013.

In Trentino the centre-left came first, but Civic Choice, which included Lorenzo Dellai's Union for Trentino, had a strong showing. In South Tyrol the South Tyrolean People's Party was confirmed as the largest party, but Die Freiheitlichen had their best result ever in a general election.

Results

Chamber of Deputies

Trentino

|-
|- bgcolor="#E9E9E9"
!rowspan="1" align="left" valign="top"|Coalition leader
!rowspan="1" align="center" valign="top"|votes
!rowspan="1" align="center" valign="top"|votes (%)
!rowspan="1" align="left" valign="top"|Party
!rowspan="1" align="center" valign="top"|votes
!rowspan="1" align="center" valign="top"|votes (%)
|-
!rowspan="3" align="left" valign="top"|Pier Luigi Bersani
|rowspan="3" valign="top"|94,960
|rowspan="3" valign="top"|30.9

|align="left"|Democratic Party
|valign="top"|72,852
|valign="top"|23.7
|-
|align="left"|South Tyrolean People's Party (including PATT)
|valign="top"|14,650
|valign="top"|4.8
|-
|align="left"|Left Ecology Freedom
|valign="top"|7,458
|valign="top"|2.4

|-
!rowspan="3" align="left" valign="top"|Silvio Berlusconi
|rowspan="3" valign="top"|71,983	
|rowspan="3" valign="top"|23.4

|align="left"|The People of Freedom
|valign="top"|46.187
|valign="top"|15.0
|-
|align="left"|Lega Nord
|valign="top"|22.523
|valign="top"|7.3
|-
|align="left"|Others
|valign="top"|3.273
|valign="top"|1.0

|-
!rowspan="1" align="left" valign="top"|Beppe Grillo
|rowspan="1" valign="top"|63,758
|rowspan="1" valign="top"|20.8

|align="left"|Five Star Movement
|valign="top"|63,758
|valign="top"|20.8

|-
!rowspan="2" align="left" valign="top"|Mario Monti
|rowspan="2" valign="top"|63,603
|rowspan="2" valign="top"|20.7

|align="left"|Civic Choice (including UpT)
|valign="top"|60,030
|valign="top"|19.6
|-
|align="left"|Union of the Centre
|valign="top"|3,573
|valign="top"|1.2

|-
!rowspan="1" align="left" valign="top"|Antonio Ingroia
|rowspan="1" valign="top"|5,976
|rowspan="1" valign="top"|1.9

|align="left"|Civil Revolution
|valign="top"|5,976
|valign="top"|1.9

|-
!rowspan="1" align="left" valign="top"|Oscar Giannino
|rowspan="1" valign="top"|5,021
|rowspan="1" valign="top"|1.6

|align="left"|Act to Stop the Decline
|valign="top"|5,021
|valign="top"|1.6

|-
!rowspan="1" align="left" valign="top"|Others
|rowspan="1" valign="top"|1,747
|rowspan="1" valign="top"|0.6

|align="left"|Others
|valign="top"|1,747
|valign="top"|0.6

|-
|- bgcolor="#E9E9E9"
!rowspan="1" align="left" valign="top"|Total coalitions
!rowspan="1" align="right" valign="top"|307,048
!rowspan="1" align="right" valign="top"|100.0
!rowspan="1" align="left" valign="top"|Total parties
!rowspan="1" align="right" valign="top"|307,048
!rowspan="1" align="right" valign="top"|100.0
|}
Source: Ministry of the Interior

South Tyrol

|-
|- bgcolor="#E9E9E9"
!rowspan="1" align="left" valign="top"|Coalition leader
!rowspan="1" align="center" valign="top"|votes
!rowspan="1" align="center" valign="top"|votes (%)
!rowspan="1" align="left" valign="top"|Party
!rowspan="1" align="center" valign="top"|votes
!rowspan="1" align="center" valign="top"|votes (%)
|-
!rowspan="3" align="left" valign="top"|Pier Luigi Bersani
|rowspan="3" valign="top"|176,128
|rowspan="3" valign="top"|58.9

|align="left"|South Tyrolean People's Party
|valign="top"|132,154
|valign="top"|44.2
|-
|align="left"|Democratic Party
|valign="top"|28,372
|valign="top"|9.5
|-
|align="left"|Left Ecology Freedom (including Greens)
|valign="top"|15,602
|valign="top"|5.2

|-
!rowspan="1" align="left" valign="top"|Ulli Mair
|rowspan="1" valign="top"|47,634
|rowspan="1" valign="top"|15.9

|align="left"|Die Freiheitlichen
|valign="top"|47,634
|valign="top"|15.9

|-
!rowspan="1" align="left" valign="top"|Beppe Grillo
|rowspan="1" valign="top"|24,864
|rowspan="1" valign="top"|8.3

|align="left"|Five Star Movement
|valign="top"|24,864
|valign="top"|8.3

|-
!rowspan="2" align="left" valign="top"|Silvio Berlusconi
|rowspan="2" valign="top"|24,263
|rowspan="2" valign="top"|8.1

|align="left"|The People of Freedom
|valign="top"|19,941
|valign="top"|6.7
|-
|align="left"|Others
|valign="top"|4,322
|valign="top"|1.4

|-
!rowspan="2" align="left" valign="top"|Mario Monti
|rowspan="2" valign="top"|20,639
|rowspan="2" valign="top"|6.9

|align="left"|Civic Choice
|valign="top"|19,409
|valign="top"|6.5
|-
|align="left"|Others
|valign="top"|1,230
|valign="top"|0.4

|-
!rowspan="1" align="left" valign="top"|Others
|rowspan="1" valign="top"|5,657
|rowspan="1" valign="top"|1.9

|align="left"|Others
|valign="top"|5,657
|valign="top"|1.9

|-
|- bgcolor="#E9E9E9"
!rowspan="1" align="left" valign="top"|Total coalitions
!rowspan="1" align="right" valign="top"|299,185
!rowspan="1" align="right" valign="top"|100.0
!rowspan="1" align="left" valign="top"|Total parties
!rowspan="1" align="right" valign="top"|299,185
!rowspan="1" align="right" valign="top"|100.0
|}
Source: Ministry of the Interior

MPs elected in Trentino-Alto Adige/Südtirol

Chamber of Deputies
South Tyrolean People's Party
Albrecht Plangger
Renate Gebhard
Daniel Alfreider
Mauro Ottobre (PATT)
Manfred Schullian

Democratic Party
Gianclaudio Bressa
Michele Nicoletti
Maria Luisa Gnecchi

The People of Freedom
Michaela Biancofiore

Five Star Movement
Riccardo Fraccaro

Civic Choice
Lorenzo Dellai (UpT)

Left Ecology Freedom
Florian Kronbichler (Greens)

Senate
South Tyrolean People's Party
Hans Berger
Karl Zeller

South Tyrolean People's Party – Democratic Party
Francesco Palermo (PD)

Democratic Party – Union of Trentino – Trentino Tyrolean Autonomist Party
Franco Panizza (UpT)
Vittorio Fravezzi (PATT)
Giorgio Tonini (PD)

The People of Freedom – Lega Nord
Sergio Divina (LNT)

Elections in Trentino-Alto Adige/Südtirol
2013 elections in Italy
February 2013 events in Italy